Carlos is a Spanish and Portuguese surname. Notable people with the surname include:

 Bettina Carlos (born 1987), Filipino actress and host
 Bun E. Carlos (born 1950; birth name Brad Carlson), American musician; drummer for Cheap Trick
 Cisco Carlos (born 1940), American baseball player
 Dionardo Carlos (born 1966), Filipino police officer
 John Carlos (born 1945), American track and field athlete
Keith Carlos (born 1987), American model and former football player
 Roberto Carlos (disambiguation), several people
 Wendy Carlos (born 1939),  American composer and musician
 William Careless (Carlos) (c. 1610–1689), English Royalist officer during the English Civil War

See also

Carles (name)
Carlo (name)
Carlon

Spanish-language surnames
Portuguese-language surnames